Jean-Marc Guillou (born 20 December 1945) is a French football coach and former player, who played at the 1978 World Cup.

Club career
Guillou was born in Bouaye, Loire-Atlantique. He played for Angers SCO, OGC Nice, Neuchâtel Xamax, FC Mulhouse, and AS Cannes.

International career
Guillou made his debut for the France national team in March 1974 in a match against Romania, which France won 1–0. Between 1974 and 1978 he played 19 times for the French national side, including at the 1978 World Cup in Argentina.

He played his last match for France at the 1978 World Cup losing to Italy 2–1 on 2 June in Mar del Plata.

Post-playing career
Guillou gave former Arsenal manager Arsène Wenger his first break in coaching by appointing him as his assistant at AS Cannes in 1983.

Guillou was the founder of the Abidjan football school Académie de Sol Beni, eventually becoming the manager, technical director and coach at ASEC Abidjan. He currently runs a number of football schools in Africa and Thailand under the name Académie Jean-Marc Guillou (Academy J.M.G.) seeking to develop young footballers who are often transferred to European clubs, the football talent academies are based in Abidjan, Antsika, Algiers and Bangkok.

Honours
Angers
Championnat de France de football: 1969

References

External links

Profile 

1945 births
Living people
Footballers from Loire-Atlantique
Association football midfielders
French footballers
France international footballers
1978 FIFA World Cup players
Angers SCO players
OGC Nice players
Neuchâtel Xamax FCS players
FC Mulhouse players
AS Cannes players
Ligue 1 players
Ligue 2 players
French football managers
OGC Nice managers
Neuchâtel Xamax FCS managers
FC Mulhouse managers
AS Cannes managers
Servette FC managers
French expatriate footballers
French expatriate football managers
French expatriate sportspeople in Switzerland
Expatriate footballers in Switzerland
Expatriate football managers in Switzerland
French expatriate sportspeople in Belgium
Expatriate football managers in Belgium